José Ortega Chumilla (born October 2, 1963 in Yecla, Murcia) is a former boxer from Spain, who represented his native country at two consecutive Summer Olympics, starting in 1988. At the 1992 Summer Olympics in Barcelona, Spain he was eliminated in the second round of the heavyweight division (– 91 kg) by New Zealand's David Tua.

1988 Olympic results
Below is the record of José Ortega, a Spanish heavyweight boxer who competed at the 1988 Seoul Olympics:

 Round of 32: lost to Gyula Alvics (Hungary) by decision, 0-5

External links
  Spanish Olympic Committee

1963 births
Living people
People from Yecla
Sportspeople from the Region of Murcia
Heavyweight boxers
Boxers at the 1988 Summer Olympics
Boxers at the 1992 Summer Olympics
Olympic boxers of Spain
Spanish male boxers